René Peters (born 15 June 1981) is a former Luxembourgish football player who currently manages US Hostert. He was captain of the national team during his playing days.

Club career
Peters was member of the professional squad of Belgian side Standard Liège in the 99/00 season but did not make the grade there and moved to French Ligue 2 outfit Créteil only to leave them after one season to stay with Swift Hesperange for 7 seasons.

In summer 2008 he joined Jeunesse.

International career
Peters made his debut for Luxembourg in an April 2000 friendly match against Estonia and by the end of his international career had earned 91 caps, scoring 4 goals. He played in 21 FIFA World Cup qualification matches.

He scored an international goal for the Luxembourg national football team on 11 October 2008 against Israel in the qualifying campaign for the 2010 FIFA World Cup.

International goals
Scores and results list Luxembourg's goal tally first.

[*] Note: Not a full FIFA international, and unofficial for Faroe Islands.

References

External links
 
 

1981 births
Living people
Sportspeople from Luxembourg City
Luxembourgian footballers
Standard Liège players
US Créteil-Lusitanos players
FC Swift Hesperange players
Jeunesse Esch players
Luxembourg international footballers
People from Dudelange
Association football midfielders